The Karenni National Progressive Party (abbr. KNPP) is a Karenni political organisation in Kayah State, Myanmar (Burma). Its armed wing, the Karenni Army, fought against government forces for an independent Karenni State from 1957 until a ceasefire in 2012. A similar ceasefire deal was signed in 1995, but it was dissolved within three months. In 2021, KNPP became a member of the National Unity Consultative Council.

References 

Rebel groups in Myanmar
Political parties in Myanmar
Separatism in Myanmar